Siegfried (died 3 December 937) was the Count and Margrave of Merseburg from an unknown date before 934 until his death. He does not appear with the title of margrave in contemporary royal charters and diplomas, so the title was informal and never official.

Siegfried was probably the son of Thietmar, the tutor of Henry I of Germany. He was made procurator of the Duchy of Saxony in 936. Otto I put his younger brother Henry under the "protective custory" of Siegfried (or perhaps in Bavaria) during his coronation festivities. At that time, Siegfried was "second after the king," according to Widukind of Corvey.

When Siegfried died, his march was disputed between Thankmar, his cousin (through their mothers) and the king's brother, and Gero, his own brother and the king's appointee.

Siegfried's first wife was Ermenburg (Irminburg), daughter of Otto I, Duke of Saxony, and Hathui. His second wife (936) was Guthia (Guhtiu), who as a widow became the foundress and first abbess of Gröningen.

Notes

Sources

Margraves of Merseburg
937 deaths
Year of birth unknown